Mark Godbeer (born 22 November 1983) is a British bare-knuckle boxer and former mixed martial artist. A professional MMA competitor from 2009 until 2018, he competed for the UFC, Bellator MMA, Absolute Championship Akhmat, and BAMMA. He is a former BAMMA heavyweight champion. In bare-knuckle boxing, he is a former  Valor heavyweight champion, and a BKB British heavyweight champion.

Early life
Starting training in MMA relatively late at the age of 25, Godbeer originally ran his own plastering business before focusing on mixed martial arts.

Mixed martial arts career

Early career
Godbeer made his professional MMA debut on 7 August 2009 with a TKO victory over Sam Hooker. While fighting for numerous regional promotions, he amassed a record of 7–1 with all victories coming by way of knockout or submission. Following this, he was signed by BAMMA in 2012 to compete in their heavyweight division.

BAMMA and Bellator MMA
Between March 2012 and May 2016, Godbeer would remain undefeated in the BAMMA cage. During this time, he also signed on with Bellator MMA and would make a single appearance for the promotion, facing notable heavyweight Cheick Kongo on 4 October 2013 at Bellator 102. Following that loss, Godbeer would claim three straight victories in BAMMA, including winning the heavyweight title against Paul Taylor on 13 June 2015. During this run he would announce a brief retirement from MMA due to injury, but ended that retirement in May 2016 to defend the BAMMA heavyweight title.

Ultimate Fighting Championship
Godbeer signed with the UFC in September 2016.

He made his promotional debut on 19 November 2016 against Justin Ledet at UFC Fight Night 99. He would lose the bout via submission in the first round.

Godbeer was expected to face Todd Duffee on 4 March 2017, at UFC 209. However, Duffee pulled out of the fight in mid-February for undisclosed reasons. He was replaced by promotional newcomer Daniel Spitz. Godbeer got his first ufc win under coach Brian Martin Gallacher and the Scottish hit squad team by unanimous decision.

Godbeer was expected to face Walt Harris on 7 October 2017 at UFC 216 before a fight-day injury to Derrick Lewis took him out of his scheduled fight with Fabricio Werdum. As a result, Harris was moved on to face Werdum, and Godbeer was pulled from the event.

The bout with Harris was rescheduled for 4 November 2017 at UFC 217. Godbeer won the fight via disqualification after Harris hit Godbeer with a head kick following the referee called a time out due to a groin strike.

Godbeer was expected to face promotional newcomer Dmitry Poberezhets on 17 March 2018 at UFC Fight Night 127. However, it was announced on 25 January 2018 Poberezhets was injured and he was replaced by Dmitriy Sosnovskiy. Godbeer lost the fight via submission in the second round.

Godbeer was briefly scheduled to face Luis Henrique in his return to light heavyweight division on 22 September 2018 at UFC Fight Night 137. However, Godbeer pulled out of the fight in early August, citing injury, and was replaced by promotional newcomer Ryan Spann. Godbeer announced his retirement on 25 September 2018 .

Bare-knuckle boxing

Valor Bare Knuckle 
Mark Godbeer, while retired from MMA, transitioned over to bare-knuckle boxing and entered Ken Shamrock's newly founded Valor Bare Knuckle for its debut event, VBK: 1. Godbeer knocked out former fellow UFC, Bellator, & BAMMA veteran Jack "The Outlaw" May. Goddbeer knocked May out in less than a minute. He then faced current Road FC Open-weight Champion Mighty Mo in the main event for the tournament championship. Godbeer defeated Mo when after a series of punches Mo was knocked down and unable to get up in time for the 10 count, winning the VBK tournament.

Bare Knuckle Fighting Championship
On September 5, 2020, it was announced that Godbeer had signed with the Bare Knuckle Fighting Championship.

Gromda 
In 2022, it was announced that Godbeer had signed with Polish bare-knuckle promotion Gromda. He made his debut on June 10, 2022 against Bartłomiej Domalik for the Gromda International Openweight Championship, losing by second-round TKO.

Championships and achievements

Mixed martial arts
BAMMA
BAMMA Heavyweight Championship (One time)

Bare-knuckle boxing
Valor Bare Knuckle
Valor Heavyweight Tournament Champion (One time)
BKB
BKB British Heavyweight Champion (One time)

Mixed martial arts record

|-
|Loss
|align=center|13–5
|Sergey Bilostenniy
|TKO (punches)
|ACA 95: Tumenov vs. Abdulaev 
|
|align=center|1
|align=center|2:04
|Moscow, Russia
|
|- 
|Loss
|align=center|13–4
|Dmitriy Sosnovskiy
|Submission (rear-naked choke)
|UFC Fight Night: Werdum vs. Volkov 
|
|align=center|2
|align=center|4:29
|London, England
|
|-  
|Win
|align=center|13–3
|Walt Harris
|DQ (illegal head kick)
|UFC 217
|
|align=center|1
|align=center|4:29
|New York City, New York, United States
|
|-
|Win
|align=center|12–3
|Daniel Spitz
|Decision (unanimous)
|UFC 209
|
|align=center|3
|align=center|5:00
|Las Vegas, Nevada, United States
|
|-
| Loss
| align=center| 11–3
| Justin Ledet
| Submission (rear-naked choke)
| UFC Fight Night: Mousasi vs. Hall 2
| 
| align=center| 1
| align=center| 2:16
| Belfast, Northern Ireland
| 
|-
| Win
| align=center| 11–2
| Stuart Austin
| TKO (punches)
| BAMMA 25: Champion vs. Champion
| 
| align=center| 2
| align=center| 1:24
| Birmingham, England
|
|-
| Win
| align=center| 10–2
| Paul Taylor
| TKO (retirement)
| BAMMA 21: DeVent vs. Kone
| 
| align=center| 2
| align=center| 4:43
| Birmingham, England
|
|-
| Win
| align=center| 9–2
| Thomas Denham
| TKO (punches)
| BAMMA 19: Petley vs. Stapleton
| 
| align=center| 1
| align=center| 1:33
| Blackpool, England
| 
|-
| Loss
| align=center| 8–2
| Cheick Kongo
| TKO (knees and punches)
| Bellator 102
| 
| align=center| 2
| align=center| 2:04
| Visalia, California, United States
|
|-
| Win
| align=center| 8–1
| Catalin Zmarandescu
| TKO (corner stoppage)
| BAMMA 9: Watson vs. Marshman
| 
| align=center| 1
| align=center| 5:00
| Birmingham, England
| 
|-
| Loss
| align=center| 7–1
| Anthony Taylor
| TKO (punches)
| Supremacy Fight Challenge 4
| 
| align=center| 2
| align=center| 1:22
| Gateshead, England
|Return to Heavyweight
|-
| Win
| align=center| 7–0
| Tomas Vaicickas
| TKO (punches)
| Pain Pit Fight Night 1
| 
| align=center| 1
| align=center| 0:19
| Newport, Wales
|
|-
| Win
| align=center| 6–0
| Malik Merad
| Submission (guillotine choke)
| Head to Head: The Big Guns
| 
| align=center| 2
| align=center| 3:00
| North Petherton, England
| 
|-
| Win
| align=center| 5–0
| Chris Konieczny
| TKO (body kick and punches)
| Tear Up 4: Clash of the Giants
| 
| align=center| 2
| align=center| 0:46
| Bristol, England
| 
|-
| Win
| align=center| 4–0
| Fraser Opie
| Submission (guillotine choke)
| South West FC 1
| 
| align=center| 1
| align=center| 3:26
| Torquay England
|Return to Light Heavyweight
|-
| Win
| align=center| 3–0
| Paul Pestell
| TKO (punches)
| All or Nothing: Head to Head
| 
| align=center| 1
| align=center| 1:00
| Bridgwater, England
|Heavyweight debut
|-
| Win
| align=center| 2–0
| Ibrar Malik
| TKO (punches)
| Bristol Fight Club: Fight Night
| 
| align=center| 2
| align=center| 2:20
| South Gloucestershire, England
| 
|-
| Win
| align=center| 1–0
| Sam Hooker
| TKO (punches)
| KnuckleUp MMA 2: Beer vs. Jazbutis
| 
| align=center| 2
| align=center| 0:00
| Wells, England
|

Bare-Knuckle Boxing

|-
|Loss
|align=center|3–1
|Bartłomiej Domalik
|TKO (punches)
|Gromda 9: Balboa vs. Godbeer
|
|align=center|2
|align=center|0:55
|Pionki, Poland, Gromda Fight Club
|For Gromda International Openweight Championship
|-
|Win
|align=center|3–0
|Mighty Mo
|TKO (stoppage)
|VBK-Valor Bare Knuckle 1 
|
|align=center|1
|align=center|2:56
|New Town, ND, USA, 4 Bears Casino and Lodge
|Heavyweight Tournament Final
|-
|Win
|align=center|2–0
|Jack "The Outlaw" May
|KO (punch)
|VBK-Valor Bare Knuckle 1
|
|align=center|1
|align=center|0:50
|New Town, ND, USA, 4 Bears Casino and Lodge
|Heavyweight Tournament Semi-Final
|-
|Win
|align=center|1–0
|Mickey Parker
|Decision (Unanimous)
|BKB 16
|
|align=center|5
|align=center|2:00
|London, England, O2 Arena

|Won BKB British Heavyweight Championship
|-
|

See also
List of current UFC fighters
List of male mixed martial artists
List of male kickboxers

References

External links
Official UFC Profile

Living people
1983 births
English male mixed martial artists
Heavyweight mixed martial artists
Mixed martial artists utilizing boxing
Ultimate Fighting Championship male fighters
Sportspeople from Taunton
Bare-knuckle boxers